Mary Kay and Johnny is an American situation comedy starring real-life married couple Mary Kay and Johnny Stearns. It was the first sitcom broadcast on a network television in the United States. Mary Kay and Johnny initially aired live on the DuMont Television Network before moving to CBS and then NBC.

Format
Plots centered around a bank employee and his "zany, but not dumb" wife and the problems that they encountered. Much of the activity occurred in the couple's apartment in Greenwich Village.

A review in the March 6, 1948, issue of the trade publication Billboard began, "This program comes close to being a model tele[vision] show. In detailing the adventures, mainly domestic, of a young married couple, Johnny and Mary Kay Stearns have come up with charming and fresh material, which always takes into consideration that there are cameras taking everything in." Later in the review, however, the author wrote, "At times the show got just a bit too cute" with the female star squealing too much and the story falling into familiar family sitcom patterns.

Cast
In addition to the Stearnses, the cast included their son, Christopher Stearns, as himself. Mary Kay's mother was played by Nydia Westman, and Johnny's friend Howie was played by Howard Thomas. Jim Stevenson was the announcer.

Broadcast history
The first 15-minute episode debuted on the DuMont Television Network on Tuesday, November 18, 1947. The Stearnses created and wrote all the scripts. The program was broadcast live, most of the action taking place on a set representing the New York City apartment of the title characters, a young married couple.

Mary Kay and Johnny was the first program to show a couple sharing a bed, and the first series to show a woman's pregnancy on television: Mary Kay became pregnant in 1948 and after unsuccessfully trying to hide her pregnancy, the producers wrote it into the show. On December 31, 1948, the Stearns' weeks-old son Christopher appeared on the show and became a character.

After a year on DuMont, the show moved to CBS for half a year, much of the time being broadcast every weeknight, then ran for another year each Saturday night on NBC, where it debuted on October 10, 1948. It broadcast the final episode on March 11, 1950.

Viewership
At a time when there were no TV ratings (the A.C. Nielsen Company would not begin measuring TV ratings until 1950), Anacin decided to take a chance and sponsor the show.  This decision worried the advertising executives at Anacin, who thought that they might be wasting money by sponsoring a show with a sparse audience.  A simple, non-scientific scheme to gauge the size of the audience was hatched.  During one commercial spot, Anacin offered a free pocket mirror to the first 200 viewers who wrote in requesting one.  As a precaution, they purchased a total of 400 mirrors in case the audience was twice as large as they expected.  Although the free mirror was offered only during that one spot, Anacin received nearly 9000 requests for mirrors.

Episode status
DuMont's corporate successor, Metromedia, disposed of what was left of the DuMont archive in the East River.

The fate of the NBC episodes is unknown, although they also were known to have been getting rid of their older recordings in the early 1970s and disposing the ones they could not get the stars of the shows to take. The Paley Center for Media has one 1949 episode in its collection. TV Land used a clip of this one 1949 broadcast in an episode of Inside TV Land called "Taboo TV".

See also

List of programs broadcast by the DuMont Television Network
List of surviving DuMont Television Network broadcasts

Notes

References

Bibliography
David Weinstein, The Forgotten Network: DuMont and the Birth of American Television (Philadelphia: Temple University Press, 2004) 
Alex McNeil, Total Television, Fourth edition (New York: Penguin Books, 1980) 
Tim Brooks and Earle Marsh, The Complete Directory to Prime Time Network TV Shows, Third edition (New York: Ballantine Books, 1964)

External links

DuMont historical website

1947 American television series debuts
1950 American television series endings
1940s American sitcoms
1950s American sitcoms
CBS original programming
American live television series
Black-and-white American television shows
DuMont Television Network original programming
English-language television shows
NBC original programming
Television shows set in New York City
Television shows filmed in New York (state)
Television series about marriage